The 2010 Winter Olympics cauldron was erected for the 2010 Winter Olympics at Jack Poole Plaza in Vancouver, British Columbia, Canada.

See also
 2008 Summer Olympics cauldron
 2012 Summer Olympics and Paralympics cauldron
 2014 Winter Olympics cauldron
 2016 Summer Olympics cauldron

External links
 

2010 establishments in British Columbia
Cauldron
Coal Harbour
Olympic flame